The DxO ONE from DxO is a small camera that attaches to a tablet or smartphone. It was originally compatible with iPhone and iPad using the Lightning connector port, and more recently with some Android phones. It was introduced in June 2015. The DxO ONE has a 1-inch format, 20.2 megapixel image sensor—the same one that is found in the Sony Cyber-shot DSC-RX100—and an f/1.8 maximum-aperture lens and high-speed shutter. The ONE uses the attached mobile device as an electronic viewfinder for the camera, which does not have its own viewfinder.

European Imaging and Sound Association awarded the DxO ONE its prize for photo innovation for 2015–2016. DxO has also created a website where photographers can showcase images taken with the DxO ONE.

Specifications 
 20.2 megapixel 1-inch format BSI-CMOS image sensor
 Records still images in JPEG, RAW (DNG), and SuperRAW (DXO) formats
 Metering modes: Auto, Program, Shutter-priority, Aperture-priority, and Manual
 Scene modes: Sports, Landscape, Portrait, and Nighttime
 Exposure compensation adjustment
 ISO settings range from 100 to 12,800 plus 25,600 and 51,200 (Hi 1 and Hi 2) and Auto
 Focus via contrast-detect Autofocus, with face-detection, or via the touchscreen on the connected mobile device
 Video recording with single-channel audio in 1080p 30fps, or 720p 120fps for slow-motion
 microSD card slot for recording images and videos
 microUSB connector for charging and transferring images and videos to a computer

The DxO ONE includes a SuperRAW image format that records for raw images in quick succession for later post-processing. Temporal noise reduction is then performed on the set of images.

It can be rotated up to 60 degrees each way once it is connected via the Lightning connector. For capturing a Selfie, it can be reversed to face towards the user.

Requirements 
The DxO ONE works with iPads and iPhones running iOS 8 or later and that have a lightning connector, and with some Android phones that have a USB-C connector. For proper connection between the mobile device and the DxO ONE, a case that does not occlude the area around the Lightning Connector is necessary. The DxO ONE can be used by itself, with its rear OLED screen allowing the user to switch between photo and video, but not to preview the image. This was later updated by firmware to allow the rear screen to be used as a framing assistant.

For desktop processing of raw and SuperRAW images, an Apple Mac or Windows computer is required. Images are transferred using a separate application, DxO Connect, via microUSB cable (or by directly using the microSD card that was used in the camera). Apple added support for processing DxO ONE raw files in Digital Camera Raw 6.17 and Adobe added support for them in Camera Raw 9.2.

References

External links 
DxO ONE web page

Cameras introduced in 2015
Point-and-shoot cameras
IPhone accessories